The following are the 80 municipalities of the canton of Thurgau, as of 2009.

List 

Aadorf
Affeltrangen
Altnau
Amlikon-Bissegg
Amriswil
Arbon
Basadingen-Schlattingen
Berg (TG)
Berlingen
Bettwiesen
Bichelsee-Balterswil
Birwinken
Bischofszell
Bottighofen
Braunau
Bürglen (TG)
Bussnang
Diessenhofen
Dozwil
Egnach
Erlen
Ermatingen
Eschenz
Eschlikon
Felben-Wellhausen
Fischingen
Frauenfeld
Gachnang
Gottlieben
Güttingen
Hauptwil-Gottshaus
Hefenhofen
Herdern
Hohentannen
Homburg
Horn
Hüttlingen
Hüttwilen
Kemmental
Kesswil
Kradolf-Schönenberg
Kreuzlingen
Langrickenbach
Lengwil
Lommis
Mammern
Märstetten
Matzingen
Müllheim
Münchwilen (TG)
Münsterlingen
Neunforn
Pfyn
Raperswilen
Rickenbach (TG)
Roggwil (TG)
Romanshorn
Salenstein
Salmsach
Schlatt (TG)
Schönholzerswilen
Sirnach
Sommeri
Steckborn
Stettfurt
Sulgen
Tägerwilen
Thundorf
Tobel-Tägerschen
Uesslingen-Buch
Uttwil
Wagenhausen
Wäldi
Wängi
Warth-Weiningen
Weinfelden
Wigoltingen
Wilen (TG)
Wuppenau
Zihlschlacht-Sitterdorf

References

Thurgau
 
Subdivisions of Thurgau